Echoes from the Dead is a 2013 Swedish drama film based on the eponymous novel by Johan Theorin.

Cast 
 Lena Endre - Julia Davidsson
 Tord Peterson - Gerlof Davidsson
 Johan Sundberg – Jens
 Thomas W. Gabrielsson - Lennart Henriksson
  - Nils Kant

References

External links 

2013 drama films
2013 films
Films directed by Daniel Alfredson
Films based on Swedish novels
Swedish drama films
2010s Swedish-language films
2010s Swedish films